The Famine of 1867–1869 was the last famine in Sweden, and (together with the Finnish famine of 1866–1868) the last major famine in Northern Europe.

In Sweden, the year 1867 was known as Storsvagåret ('Year of Great Weakness') and, in Tornedalen, as Lavåret ('Lichen Year') because of the bark bread made of lichen.  It contributed to the great rush of Swedish emigration to the United States.

Causes

During the 1860s, Sweden had suffered poor harvests on several occasions. The spring and summer of 1867 were much colder than usual all over Sweden. In Burträsk, for example, it was not possible to start sowing before Midsummer: snow was still left in June. The late spring was followed by a very short summer and an early autumn. This caused not just bad harvests, but also made it difficult to feed the cattle. The consequence was rising food prices.
This caused widespread famine. The famine struck throughout Sweden, but was particularly severe in the northern provinces. Because early ice and snow disturbed communications, it was hard to transport and distribute emergency food supplies to the starving areas.
A widespread drought occurred in 1868, which caused a failed harvest and starving animals.  Thus, the famine continued.

Actions

In the autumn of 1867, the government of Sweden granted emergency loans to the Northern counties, and the county governors were given permission and encouraged to establish undsättningskomitté (emergency committee) to collect the funds needed from volunteers and philanthropists. Furthermore, two central emergency committees were created by the government: one located in the capital of Stockholm and the second in Gothenburg. The press published appeals for funds to help the needed, and charity concerts, charity plays and other similar events were hosted to collect money to pay for emergency help to the victims of the famine.
Funds from outside Sweden were also contributed both from Europe and America: in fact, the foreign contributions were reportedly about as large as those from inside the country. Among the contributors from outside Sweden was Jenny Lind, with a sum of 500 kronor, and John Ericsson with a sum of 20,000 kronor (equivalent to  kronor in 2009).

The help from the emergency committees was distributed by the local city councils.  Formally, the Poor Care Regulation of 1847, which was in effect at this time, was quite liberal, and would provide help for all who needed it. In reality, however, the emergency help was severely restricted by regulations imposed by the authorities and the elite in opposition to the law, which had come to be regarded as too liberal (it was in fact to be replaced soon after by the strict Poor Care Regulation of 1871).

The terms to receive help was not merely starvation: a starvation victim would have to be willing to work to receive help, otherwise they would not be given help. An exception was made for people who were physically unable to work, such as invalids and the elderly, but the regulations stipulated that only 10 percent of the emergency help was allowed to be spent on "charity", while the rest was only to be distributed to people willing to work in exchange. Therefore, work such as road construction and home production of various form of handicraft objects were organized to give people in need of the emergency help an opportunity to work for it. In practice, these work tasks were meant as a symbolic demonstration that the government would only help those willing to work and be productive.

The local city councils were criticized for enforcing the principle of help in exchange for work so far that the most needing were left without help. An example of this abuse occurred in the parish of Grundsunda kommun in Ångermanland, where no one who could not offer Surety was given help. The local governor, Per Grundström, described in the distribution of help in the press: "A great mass of beggars and paupers could not be given anything. Torp-dwellers and other undesirables were in fact left without much at all." 
The authorities recommended that the starving people should eat Bark bread made of lichen rather than expect great amounts of flour in relief help. Some of the local emergency committees, such as the one in Härnösand, mixed the flour with lichen and had it baked to bread before distributing it. This bread, however, caused chest pains and, in children, vomiting.

Aftermath

The authorities were exposed to harsh criticism from the press because of how ineffectively the relief funds from the emergency committees were distributed, and on which terms. Notably the paper Fäderneslandet voiced its anger at the fact that those most in need of help were left without because of the unwillingness of the authorities to compromise the principle of help in exchange for work, a regulation the paper described as "quasi philosophical thoughts about the value of work".

There was widespread criticism focused on the belief that the famine in Sweden was caused by unjust distribution. This is supported by the fact that the year of 1867 was in fact a successful year for the Swedish cereal exports: the largest of the farms and estates in Sweden exported their harvests, mostly oats, to Great Britain, where it was used for horse drawn buses in London.

There was also a fact that authorities had elected to impose a more strict interpretation than the Poor Care Regulation of 1847 would have allowed, thus making the famine worse than it needed to be. The 1847 law was replaced but a few years after the famine by the very strict Poor Care Regulation of 1871, which followed the strict practice of distribution made by the elite during the famine.

The great famine of 1867–68, and the distrust and discontent over the way the authorities handled the relief help to the needy, is estimated to have contributed greatly to Swedish emigration to the United States, which skyrocketed around this time.

In fiction and media
 Svälten: Hungeråren som formade Sverige describes the famine.

See also
 Great Famine of 1695–1697
 List of famines
 Russian famine of 1601–03

References

Sweden 1867
1867 disasters in Europe
1868 disasters in Europe
1867 in Sweden
1868 in Sweden
1869 in Sweden 
1867 disasters in Sweden
1868 disasters in Sweden
1869 disasters in Sweden
1860s disasters in Sweden
Health disasters in Sweden
Health in Sweden
1860s health disasters
Swedish migration to North America
19th-century famines